Events from the year 1751 in Canada.

Incumbents
French Monarch: Louis XV
British and Irish Monarch: George II

Governors
Governor General of New France: Jacques-Pierre de Taffanel de la Jonquière, Marquis de la Jonquière
Colonial Governor of Louisiana: Pierre de Rigaud, Marquis de Vaudreuil-Cavagnial
Governor of Nova Scotia: Edward Cornwallis
Commodore-Governor of Newfoundland: Francis William Drake

Events
 Fort La Jonquière was established in 1751 by Jacques Legardeur de Saint-Pierre on the Saskatchewan River (probably in the Nipawin, Sask. area).

Births
 Philip Turnor, HBC inland surveyor (died 1799)

Deaths

Historical documents
"Good harmony [seems to be] thoroughly re-established between them" - Quiet times between French and British on Chignecto Isthmus in 1751-5 

Sieur de Saint-Ours twice rescues British ship crews threatened by Indigenous people, and is thanked (Note: "savages" used)

"Several acts of violence committed by the English" is France's complaint about British naval attacks off Nova Scotia

"We are extreamly glad to hear that so few of the better sort [have left]" - Edward Cornwallis right to stop Acadians from leaving Nova Scotia

Description of Acadian salt marsh farming includes its extent (for miles) and fertilization (Note: anti-Catholic comment)

Agreement between superior of Huron mission at Detroit and its new farmer sets out latter's duties and share of farm produce

French pursue westward expansion, strengthening Fort Niagara and sending settlers to Detroit and western Lake Erie

Map: North America, showing Canada and Louisiana

Massachusetts lieutenant governor informs legislature of New York governor's call to meet with Six Nations in Albany in June

Benjamin Franklin says "securing the Friendship of the Indians is of the greatest Consequence to these Colonies" (Note: "savages" used)

Connecticut will attend Albany conference to shore up Six Nations' loyalty and block French attempts to "render [it] precarious"

British must act on opportunity to counter French policy to draw Six Nations and other Indigenous peoples to them

Though expensive for France to maintain, Canada should be kept to thwart "the ambition of the English" in America

"Deserve our approbation" - Mi'kmaq gratify French to same degree they earn writer's condemnation for "perfidy and cruelty" (Note: "savage" used)

Quebec governor insists Haudenosaunee are in control of their lands, but New York governor lists reasons why British own them

References 

 
Canada
51